The Titan IIIC was an expendable launch system used by the United States Air Force from 1965 until 1982. It was the first Titan booster to feature large solid rocket motors and was planned to be used as a launcher for the Dyna-Soar, though the spaceplane was cancelled before it could fly. The majority of the launcher's payloads were DoD satellites, for military communications and early warning, though one flight (ATS-6) was performed by NASA. The Titan IIIC was launched exclusively from Cape Canaveral while its sibling, the Titan IIID, was launched only from Vandenberg AFB.

History
The Titan rocket family was established in October 1955 when the Air Force awarded the Glenn L. Martin Company (later Martin Marietta and now Lockheed Martin) a contract to build an intercontinental ballistic missile (SM-68). It became known as the Titan I, the nation's first two-stage ICBM, and replaced the Atlas ICBM as the second underground, vertically stored, silo-based ICBM. Both stages of the Titan I used kerosene (RP-1) and liquid oxygen (LOX) as propellants. A subsequent version of the Titan family, the Titan II, was similar to the Titan I, but was much more powerful. Designated as LGM-25C, the Titan II was the largest USAF missile at the time and burned Aerozine 50 and nitrogen tetroxide (NTO) rather than RP-1 and LOX.

The Titan III family consisted of an enhanced Titan II core with or without solid rocket strap-on boosters and an assortment of upper stages. All Solid Rocket Motor (SRM)-equipped Titans (IIIC, IIID, IIIE, 34D, and IV) launched with only the SRMs firing at liftoff, the core stage not activating until T+105 seconds, shortly before SRM jettison. The Titan IIIA (an early test variant flown in 1964–65) and IIIB (flown from 1966 to 1987 with an Agena D upper stage in both standard and extended tank variants) had no SRMs. The Titan III launchers provided assured capability and flexibility for launch of large-class payloads.

All Titan II/III/IV vehicles contained a special range safety system known as the Inadvertent Separation Destruction System (ISDS) that would activate and destroy the first stage if there was a premature second stage separation. Titans that carried Solid Rocket Boosters (SRBs) (Titan IIIC, IIID, 34D, and IV) had a second ISDS that consisted of several lanyards attached to the SRBs that would trigger and automatically destroy them if they prematurely separated from the core, said "destruction" consisting mainly of splitting the casings open to release the pressure inside and terminate thrust. The ISDS would end up being used a few times over the Titan's career.

Another slight modification to SRB-equipped Titans was the first stage engines being covered instead of the open truss structure on the Titan II/IIIA/IIIB. This was to protect the engines from the heat of the SRB exhaust.

Titan III/IV SRBs were fixed nozzle and for roll control, a small tank of nitrogen tetroxide was mounted to each motor. The  would be injected into the SRB exhaust to deflect it in the desired direction.

As the IIIC consisted of mostly proven hardware, launch problems were generally only caused by the upper stages and/or payload. The second launch in October 1965 failed when the Transtage suffered an oxidizer leak and was unable to put its payload (several small satellites) into the correct orbit. The third launch in December experienced a similar failure.

The fourth IIIC launch was used to send the LES 4 (Lincoln Experimental Satellite 4) into orbit. It was a US Air Force experimental communications satellite launched along with OV2-3, LES 3, and Oscar 4 from Cape Canaveral aboard a single Titan 3C rocket. It transmitted in X-band.

The fifth Titan IIIC (August 26, 1966) failed shortly after launch when pieces of the payload fairing started breaking off. Around 80 seconds, the remainder of the shroud disintegrated, causing loss of launch vehicle control as well as the payload (a group of IDCSP satellites intended to provide radio communication for the US Army in Vietnam). The ISDS activated automatically when one of the SRBs broke away from the stack and destroyed the entire launch vehicle. The exact reason for the shroud failure was not determined, but the fiberglass payload shrouds used on the Titan III up to this point were replaced with a metal shroud afterwards.

A Titan IIIC in November 1970 failed to place its missile early warning satellite in the correct orbit due to a Transtage failure and a 1975 launch of two DSCS II military communication satellites left in LEO by another Transtage failure.

On March 25, 1978, a launch of two DSCS II satellites ended up in the Atlantic Ocean when the Titan second stage hydraulic pump failed, resulting in engine shutdown approximately 470 seconds after launch. The Range Safety destruct command was sent, but it was unclear if the stage received it or if it had already broken up by that point.

The first Titan IIIC flew on June 18, 1965, and was the most powerful launcher used by the Air Force until it was replaced by the Titan 34D in 1982. The last IIIC was launched in March 1982.

Design

The solid motors were ignited on the ground and were designated "stage 0". They produced a combined  thrust at sea level and burned for approximately 115 seconds. Solid motor jettison occurred at approximately 116 seconds.

The first core stage ignited about 5 seconds before SRM jettison. The Aerozine 50 and NTO were stored in structurally independent tanks to minimize the hazard of the two mixing if a leak should have developed in either tank.

The upper stage, the Titan Transtage, also burned Aerozine 50 and NTO. Its two Aerojet  AJ-10-138 engines were restartable, allowing flexible orbital operations including orbital trimming, geostationary transfer and insertion, and delivery of multiple payloads to different orbits. This required complex guidance and instrumentation.

General characteristics
Primary Function: Space booster
Builder: Martin Marietta
Power Plant:
Stage 0 consists of two solid rocket motors.
Stage 1 uses two LR87 liquid propellant engines.
Stage 2 uses one LR91 liquid propellant engine.
Stage 3 uses two Aerojet  AJ-10-138 liquid propellant engines.
Length: 42 m
Stage 0: 25.91 m
Stage 1: 22.28 m
Stage 2: 7.9 m
Stage 3: 4.57 m
Diameter:
Stage 0: 3.05 m
Stage 1: 3.05 m
Stage 2: 3.05 m
Stage 3: 3.05 m
Mass:
Stage 0: Empty 33,798 kg/ea; Full 226,233 kg/ea
Stage 1: Empty 5,443 kg; Full 116,573 kg
Stage 2: Empty 2,653 kg; Full 29,188 kg
Stage 3: Empty 1,950 kg; Full 12,247 kg
Lift capability:
Up to 28,900 lb (13,100 kg) into a low Earth orbit with 28 degrees inclination.
Up to 6,600 lb (3,000 kg) into a geosynchronous transfer orbit when launched from Cape Canaveral Air Force Station, FL.
Maximum takeoff weight:  626,190 kg
Cost:
Date deployed: June 1965.
Launch sites: Cape Canaveral Air Force Station, FL., and Vandenberg Air Force Base, CA.

Launch history

References

External links

 Titan III: Research and Development for Today And Tomorrow 
Titan3C
Titan III & variations
Future Space Booster Requirements  - January–February 1969 Air University Review

1971 in spaceflight
1973 in spaceflight
1974 in spaceflight
Lockheed Martin
Titan (rocket family)
Military equipment introduced in the 1960s